Sri Krishna Leelalu (English: Krishna's Mischiefs) is a 1935 Telugu film. Famous music director S. Rajeswara Rao played the role of Bala Krishna.

Plot
This mythological film features the antics of the child Krishna (Rajeshwara Rao) from his birth to his victory over the evil Kamsa (Gaggaiah)

External links
 

1930s Telugu-language films
1935 films
Hindu mythological films
Films based on the Mahabharata
Indian musical drama films
1930s musical drama films
Indian black-and-white films
1935 drama films
Films scored by Gali Penchala Narasimha Rao